Mount Newcomb is a  mountain summit located just west of the crest of the Sierra Nevada mountain range in Tulare County, California. Mt. Newcomb ranks as the 70th highest summit in California. This mountain's name was officially adopted in 1940 by the U.S. Board on Geographic Names to honor American astronomer Simon Newcomb (1835–1909). The first ascent of the summit was made August 22, 1936, by Max Eckenburg and Bob Rumohr.

Climbing
Established climbing routes:
 Southwest Slope –  – 1936 by Max Eckenburg and Bob Rumohr
 Southwest Ridge – class 3 – 1956 by George O. Hale
 Northeast Ridge  – class 3 – 2004 by Bob Sumner 
 South Ridge – class 3
 The Keep – class 5.10 – 2001 by Dave Nettle, Aaron Zanto

Climate
According to the Köppen climate classification system, Mount Newcomb has an alpine climate. Most weather fronts originate in the Pacific Ocean, and travel east toward the Sierra Nevada mountains. As fronts approach, they are forced upward by the peaks, causing them to drop their moisture in the form of rain or snowfall onto the range (orographic lift). Precipitation runoff from this mountain drains west to the Kern River via Whitney and Rock Creeks.

See also

 List of mountain peaks of California

References

External links
 Weather forecast: Mount Newcomb

Mountains of Tulare County, California
Mountains of Sequoia National Park
North American 4000 m summits
Mountains of Northern California
Sierra Nevada (United States)